Langkoop is a locality in the Shire of West Wimmera, Victoria, Australia. Langkoop was home to the current AFL footballer and 2020 Brownlow Medalist Lachie Neale and Australian Hockey Player Hattie Shand.

References

Towns in Victoria (Australia)
Wimmera